Bravo Music is a concert band music publishing company, founded in 1999. Located in Deerfield Beach, Florida, it is a subsidiary of Hiroshima-based Brain Music. It is one of the few companies to offer original Japanese sheet music and recordings to America and Europe.

Profile 

Bravo Music is a music sales and distribution company. Brain Music, and its parent company and principal is Brain Music of Hiroshima. Bravo is involved in the sale of sheet music, CD, DVDs, the majority of which are produced in Japan. It has a large range of recordings from the All Japan Band Competition, the "world's largest music contest", which represents 14,000 bands from all age levels. It also offers original works and transcriptions for wind ensembles by Japanese and international composers, such as Yasuhide Ito, Satoshi Yagisawa, Toshio Mashima, Yo Goto, James Barnes, Wataru Hokoyama and Tetsunosuke Kushida.
Bravo Music's sales territories include all of the North, Central and South America, Europe, Africa, Oceania and the Middle East.

History 

Bravo's parent company, Brain Music, was founded in 1976 in Hiroshima, Japan. Brain is a recording/publishing company specializing in wind, classical, traditional and vocal music. Brain also cooperates with the All-Japan Band Association and other organizations to record and sell products related to their annual national band contests.
Bravo was formed in 1999 as the distributor for Brain DVDs, CDs, and sheet music in addition to their own products. Their product range has increased over time, to just under 1,500 titles as of January 2013.

Titles 
Instructional and Training DVDs:
WINDS Training Series

Performance DVDs:
Japan's Best Series (All Japan Band Contest Best Performances)
Championship Series (Japan Wind Orchestra and Ensemble Contest Best Performances)
Univisual Series (Concert performances by Tokyo Kosei Wind Orchestra and Douglas Bostock)
Feste Romane (Japan Ground Self-Defense Force Central Band's concert performances)

Reference CDs:
New Arrange Collection
New Original Collection
Seika Girls HS Band Concert
Music of Satoshi Yagisawa

Original Works:
Machu Picchu - City in the Sky - Satoshi Yagisawa
Gloriosa - Yasuhide Ito
Symphonic Dances - Yosuke Fukuda
A Prelude to the Shining Day - Yo Goto
Fu-Mon - Hiroshi Hoshina
Les trois notes du Japon - Toshio Mashima

Arrangements/Transcriptions:
De Vogelhandler - C. Zeller/ Eiji Suzuki
Merry Widow Selections - F. Lehar/Eiji Suzuki
Die Fledermaus - Selections from Operetta
Turandot - G. Puccini/Yo Goto
Dance of the Seven Veils from Salome - R. Strauss/Kazuhiro Morita

Anime Film Score Series:
Symphonic Suite Nausicaä of the Valley of the Wind - Joe Hisaishi/Kazuhiro Morita
Laputa - Castle in the Sky - Joe Hisaishi/Kazuhiro Morita
My Neighbor Totoro - Joe Hisaishi/Yo Goto
Kiki's Delivery Service - Joe Hisaishi/Kazuhiro Morita
Princess Mononoke - Joe Hisaishi/Kazuhiro Morita
Howl's Moving Castle - Symphonic Fantasy for Band -Joe Hisaishi/Yo Goto

Popstage:
Foster on My Mind - S. Foster/T. Hoshide
Samba De Loves You - Shin Kazuhara
Samba Express - Toshio Mashima

Concert Marches:
Light of Hope - Concert March & Processional - Hiroki Takahashi
March–April–May - Masao Yabe

References

External links 
Bravo Music
Brain Music
All Japan Band Association (Japanese Only)
Wind Bands and Cultural Identity in Japanese Schools 

Music publishing companies of the United States
Sheet music publishing companies
Music production companies
Companies based in Florida
Publishing companies established in 1999
1999 establishments in Florida